An expansion draft, in professional sports, occurs when a sports league decides to create one or more new expansion teams or franchises.  This occurs mainly in North American sports. One of the ways of stocking the new team or teams is an expansion draft.  Although how each league conducts them varies, and they vary from occasion to occasion, the system is usually something similar to the following:

Each existing team is told it can "protect" a certain number of its existing contracted players by furnishing their names to the league office on or before a certain date.  The expansion team(s) then are allowed to select players not on the protected lists in a manner somewhat similar to an entry draft.  There are generally a maximum number of players that can be selected from any one team, at least without the team losing the player receiving something in compensation such as a future entry draft pick.

Teams subject to losing players usually tend to put most if not all of the players they truly need to stay competitive on the protected list.  This means that the expansion franchise is usually left to choose among players who are old, injury prone, failing to develop as the teams had intended, or perhaps so highly compensated that a team wishes to remove them from the payroll.  For this reason, expansion teams are often noncompetitive in their early years in a league, although the advent of the free agent system has modified this somewhat. Marc-André Fleury, who won three Stanley Cups with the Pittsburgh Penguins, is a notable exception of a star player in their prime being left exposed in an expansion draft, being made available for the Vegas Golden Knights in the 2017 NHL Expansion Draft after Fleury was made expendable due to the rise of Matt Murray at goaltender.  The rules of the draft can be tweaked by the league to make the expansion team more competitive if that is the business objective of the league's expansion.

Most teams seem to try largely to make a team which will serve until it can begin to develop its own talent, although occasionally players discarded by their old teams benefit from the change in environment and become stars, either again or for the first time.

A similar process occurs when an existing franchise is disbanded and the players contracted to it become available to the remaining teams; this process is referred to as a dispersal draft.

Expansion drafts

American football
 1960 NFL expansion draft
 1961 NFL expansion draft
 1966 NFL expansion draft
 1967 NFL expansion draft
 1976 NFL expansion draft
 1995 NFL expansion draft
 1999 NFL expansion draft
 2002 NFL expansion draft

Australian rules football
 1986 VFL draft – one of the two expansion teams, the West Coast Eagles, was exempt from the draft until 1988 as part of their agreement to enter the VFL.
 1994 AFL draft
 1996 AFL draft – actually an expansion and dispersal draft, as Port Adelaide entered the AFL for the 1997 season, while the Brisbane Bears took over Fitzroy's operations after Fitzroy had folded at the end of round 22.
 2010 AFL draft
 2011 AFL draft

Baseball
Baseball expansion was initially hastened by the threat of a competing league, known as the Continental League.
 1960 Major League Baseball expansion draft
 1961 Major League Baseball expansion draft
 1968 Major League Baseball expansion draft
 1976 Major League Baseball expansion draft
 1992 Major League Baseball expansion draft
 1997 Major League Baseball expansion draft

Basketball

NBA

There have been 11 expansion drafts in National Basketball Association history. The most recent expansion draft was in 2004 when the Charlotte Bobcats (now Charlotte Hornets) joined the league as the 30th team.

NBA Development League
 2006 NBA Development League expansion draft
 2007 NBA Development League expansion draft
 2008 NBA Development League expansion draft
 2009 NBA Development League expansion draft
 2010 NBA Development League expansion draft
 2013 NBA Development League expansion draft
 2014 NBA Development League expansion draft
 2015 NBA Development League expansion draft

PBA
 1990 PBA Expansion Draft
 2000 PBA Expansion Draft
 2014 PBA Expansion Draft

Canadian football
2002 CFL Expansion Draft
2013 CFL Expansion Draft

Ice hockey

There have been 13 expansion drafts in the National Hockey League, including the 1979 draft following the NHL-WHA merger. The most recent draft was in 2021, involving the Seattle Kraken.

Soccer
 1997 MLS Expansion Draft
 2004 MLS Expansion Draft
 2006 MLS Expansion Draft
 2007 MLS Expansion Draft
 2008 MLS Expansion Draft
 2009 MLS Expansion Draft
 2010 MLS Expansion Draft
 2011 MLS Expansion Draft
 2014 MLS Expansion Draft
 2016 MLS Expansion Draft
 2017 MLS Expansion Draft
 2018 MLS Expansion Draft
 2019 MLS Expansion Draft
 2020 MLS Expansion Draft
 2021 MLS Expansion Draft
 2022 MLS Expansion Draft

References

External links
 Major League Baseball Historical Expansion Drafts